Hasan Abdal (Punjabi), is a city in the Attock District of Punjab Province in Pakistan, located 40 km northwest of the country's capital city, Islamabad. Hassan Abdal is the headquarters of Hasan Abdal Tehsil (sub-district).

As home of the Gurdwara Panja Sahib, one of the most sacred sites in Sikhism, Hasan Abdal is an important pilgrimage destination. The city is also notable for its association with the 16th century Mughal Emperor Akbar - several monuments in the town date to the Akbar period, including the Mughal Gardens of Wah, Hakimon ka Maqbara, and the Tomb of Lala Rukh. Hasan Abdal is also near the city of Taxila – a UNESCO World Heritage Site famous for its ancient-era Hindu and Buddhist ruins.

Location
Hasan Abdal is located near northern Punjab's boundary with Khyber Pakhtunkhwa, and was the location from which Mughal war expeditions were sent to the northwestern frontier. In modern times, Hasan Abdal lies at the intersection of the Karakoram Highway, and the M1 Motorway. As part of the multibillion-dollar China-Pakistan Economic Corridor (CPEC), the Hasan Abdal area will serve as the terminus for CPEC's Western Alignment, while the Hakla–Dera Ismail Khan Motorway will commence at Hasan Abdal.

History

The famous Chinese traveler Xuanzang who visited the place in the 7th century A.D. mentions the sacred spring of Elapatra about 70 li to the northwest of Taxila which has been identified as the spring at of Gurdwara Panja Sahib.
The town is mentioned in Ain-i-Akbari in the context that Shams al-Din built himself a vault there in which Hakim Abu’l Fath lies buried. Akbar’s visit to the town on his way back from Kashmir is also mentioned.

William Finch who travelled through India between 1608 and 1611 described Hasan Abdal to be a "pleasant town with a small river and many fair tanks in which are many fishes with golden rings in their noses ...; the water so clear that you may see a penny in the bottom".

The town was the seat for Mughal warring expeditions to the northwest frontier. The Mughal emperor Jehangir mentions the town in his Tuzk-e-Jahangiri by the name of Baba Hasan Abdal where he stayed for three days. He also praised the city in these words: "The celebrated place at this station is a spring which flows from the foot of a little hill, exceedingly clear, sweet and nice...". Hasan Abdal was visited by various Mughal kings on their way to Kashmir

Raja Man Singh built the nearby Wah Gardens during the reign of Akbar. The terraced gardens were divided into four parts. Shah Jahan rested at Hasan Abdal's Wah Gardens on his four expeditions to Kabul. Emperor Aurangzeb stayed at the town for over a year beginning in 1674, in order to quell the "Afridi Revolt". The presence of Emperor Aurangzeb at the gardens convinced many local Pashtun tribes to abandon the rebellion, and join forces with the Mughals.

Gurdwara
In 1521 the founder of the Sikh faith, Guru Nanak, arrived in Hasan Abdal. A Gurudwara called Panja Sahib was built on the spot that he stayed containing a sacred rock that is believed to contain the hand print of Guru Nanak. Punja or panja ( (Shahmukhi); ਪੰਜਾ (Gurmukhi)) :hand or paw. There are different traditions about the origin of the Hand print.

Infrastructure
Hasan Abdal is located near the intersection of the Karakoram Highway heading northwest, and the M1 Motorway that connects Hassan Abdal to points northwest and southeast. As part of the multibillion-dollar China–Pakistan Economic Corridor (CPEC), the Karakoram Highway will be rebuilt, while the Hasan Abdal area will serve as the terminus for CPEC's Western Alignment. From the nearby village of Hakla, the Hakla–Dera Ismail Khan Motorway will run southwest out of the city and link Hassan Abdal to Dera Ismail Khan in Khyber Pakhtunkhwa province.

Education
The city has several state owned primary schools, a high school each for boys and girls, a higher secondary school each for boys and girls and a degree college for women. There are a number of privately run schools to make up for the shortfall of the state owned ones. These include Trends School, and Presentation Convent High School, the latter of which was established in 1956.

Cadet College, Hasan Abdal
Cadet College Hasan Abdal is the first Cadet College in Pakistan and was established by the government of Punjab at the initiative of General Muhammad Ayub Khan, the then Commander-in-Chief of the Pakistan Army, originally to serve as a feeder institution to the Services Academies. For this purpose, Military Wings were started in 1952 in Government College, Sahiwal, and Islamia College, Peshawar. On the completion of buildings at the present location, the Military Wings were shifted to Hasan Abdal and the Cadet College started functioning as Punjab Cadet College in April 1954. In 1960, the government constituted a Board of Governors to exercise administrative control over the college. 
Hugh Catchpole (1907-1997) was the founder Principal of the College. According to his will he was buried at Cadet College Hasan Abdal. He served at Cadet College Hasan Abdal for 4 years then he joined PAF Public School Sargodha as founder principal.

The college is located on the Rawalpindi/Peshawar road about 29 miles (48 km) from Rawalpindi/Islamabad, in natural surroundings near the junction of the National Highway and Grand Trunk Road.

Environment
Surrounded by the fresh water springs with crystal clear water and Loquat orchards the city used to be an idyllic place till recent past. Its beauty as mentioned in the earliest accounts has somehow survived the ill planning that has resulted in an exponential increase in its population.

See also
Grand Trunk Road
Karakoram Highway
Taxila

References

External links

A Trip to Hassan Abdal

Cities and towns in Attock District
Tehsils in Attock District
Sikh places
Sikhism in Pakistan
Guru Nanak Dev